Bull ring may refer to:

 Bullring, an arena in which bullfighting takes place
 Bull Ring, Birmingham, a city-centre area of Birmingham, England
 The Bull Ring, a henge in England
 Bull Ring, Wakefield, central point of the Wakefield town centre
 Bull Ring, Cirencester, the Roman amphitheatre of Corinium Dobunnorum
 Wanderers Stadium, in Johannesburg